Ryan Freeland is an American record producer, songwriter, engineer, and mixer based in Los Angeles. Freeland is a five-time Grammy Award winner and is best known for his work with Bonnie Raitt, Ray LaMontagne, Aimee Mann, Joe Henry, Grant-Lee Phillips, Hugh Laurie, Ingrid Michaelson, Loudon Wainwright III, Rodney Crowell, Alana Davis, and Jonatha Brooke. He is represented exclusively by Global Positioning Services Management in Santa Monica.

Life and career

Personal life
Freeland began playing the piano at age 6 from the encouragement of his mother, and continued studying classical and jazz piano at Interlochen Arts Academy. He later attended California State University, Chico where he completed a bachelor's degree in music with a minor in English.

Work with Bob Clearmountain
After working for six months at Kiva Recording Studio in Memphis, Freeland heard that the esteemed producer, engineer and mixer Bob Clearmountain was looking for an assistant engineer at his new private studio in Pacific Palisades. He decided to cold call Clearmountain and landed up getting the position. Freeland describes it as “a life-changing event” and from 1994 to 1998 he was Clearmountain's second engineer.

He then moved on to become an independent engineer, and some of his first projects included Aimee Mann and Jonathan Brooke, whom he had met by working with Bob Clearmountain. He has since worked for 20 years as an independent producer, engineer and mixer.

Stampede Origin Studios
Freeland works from his custom-built two story studio “Stampede Origin Studio” in Culver City, CA. The facility features a large live room, two isolation booths and amplifier closets, while the second floor hosts the main control room, listening area, a kitchenette and a third isolation booth often used for vocals. Five full-racks house most of his outboard gear, and the studio is home to a large collection of new and vintage microphones and instruments.

Grammy Awards
Freeland is a five-time Grammy award winner and has won awards for the following albums:

 2009: Ramblin' Jack Elliott - “A Stranger Here”, Best Traditional Blues Album (Engineer, Mixer)
 2010: The Carolina Chocolate Drops - “Genuine Negro Jig”, Best Traditional Folk Album (Engineer, Mixer)
 2010: Ray LaMontagne - “God Willin' and the Creek Don't Rise”, Best Contemporary Folk Album (Engineer, Mixer)
 2012: Bonnie Raitt - “Slipstream”, Best Americana Album (Engineer, Mixer)
 2018: Aimee Mann - "Mental Illness", Best Folk Album (Engineer, Mixer)

Selected discography

References

Living people
American record producers
American audio engineers
American male songwriters
Year of birth missing (living people)